Stephen Gordon Salter (1938 – 7 May 2006) was an Australian politician. In 1982, he was elected to the Tasmanian House of Assembly as a Liberal member for Wilmot. He served until his defeat in 1986.

References

1938 births
2006 deaths
Liberal Party of Australia members of the Parliament of Tasmania
Members of the Tasmanian House of Assembly
20th-century Australian politicians